Archery at the 2020 Summer Paralympics was held at Dream Island Archery Park in Tokyo Bay Zone It consisted of 9 events (3 men, 3 women, 3 mixed teams). It was expected that there would be 140 archer slots in the qualifying rounds to the countdown of the Games.

The 2020 Summer Olympic and Paralympic Games were postponed to 2021 due to the COVID-19 pandemic. They kept the 2020 name and were held from 24 August to 5 September 2021.

Qualification

Competition schedule

Participating nations
As of 24 August 2021

 (Host country)

Events
There were 140 archers (80 men and 60 women) competing in 9 medal events.

Medal summary

Medal table

Medalists

See also
Archery at the 2020 Summer Olympics

References

External links
Results book 

2020 Summer Paralympics events
2020
International archery competitions hosted by Japan
Paralympics